Cold Spring Grange Hall is a historic building located in the Cold Spring section of Lower Township, Cape May County, New Jersey, United States. The hall was built in 1912 and added to the National Register of Historic Places on March 30, 1998.

It was used as a Grange Hall. The Grange Hall is at the entrance of Historic Cold Spring Village and is run as a restaurant.

See also
National Register of Historic Places listings in Cape May County, New Jersey

References

Lower Township, New Jersey
Clubhouses on the National Register of Historic Places in New Jersey
Buildings and structures in Cape May County, New Jersey
Grange organizations and buildings
National Register of Historic Places in Cape May County, New Jersey
New Jersey Register of Historic Places
Grange buildings on the National Register of Historic Places